The Basketball Tournament 2016 was the third edition of The Basketball Tournament, a 5-on-5, single elimination basketball tournament. The tournament involved 64 teams; it started on July 9 and continued through August 2, 2016. The winner of the final, Overseas Elite, received a two million dollar prize. The semifinals were broadcast on ESPN2, and the championship game—played at Rose Hill Gymnasium at Fordham University in The Bronx—was broadcast on ESPN.

Format
The tournament field consisted of 64 teams, organized into four regions of 16 teams each. The sixteen teams in each region were eleven teams selected by fans via the tournament's website, three teams selected at-large, the defending regional winner from the 2015 tournament, and the team that raised the most money for Big Brothers Big Sisters of America via GoFundMe.

Source: 

The winning team (its players, coaches, general manager, and boosters) received 90% of the $2 million prize, while the remaining 10% was split amongst the team's top 100 fans (based on points earned online).

Venues
The Basketball Tournament 2016 took place in five locations.

Alumni Teams
Multiple teams in the tournament were composed mostly or exclusively of alumni of a particular school, including those listed here.

Bracket

Source:

Semifinals & final

Source:

National Championship

Awards

Source:

References

Further reading

External links
 TBT Flashback - 2016 Championship Game via YouTube

The Basketball Tournament
2016–17 in American basketball
2016 in sports in California
2016 in sports in Illinois
2016 in sports in New York City
2016 in sports in North Carolina
2016 in sports in Pennsylvania
2016 in Los Angeles
2016 in Philadelphia
2010s in Chicago
2010s in the Bronx
July 2016 sports events in the United States
August 2016 sports events in the United States
Basketball competitions in New York City
Fordham, Bronx
Basketball competitions in Charlotte, North Carolina
Basketball competitions in Chicago
Basketball competitions in Los Angeles
Basketball competitions in Philadelphia